Roberto Corell was a Mexican film actor. He appeared in more than eighty films during his career.

Selected filmography
 Narciso's Hard Luck (1940)
 The Unknown Policeman (1941)
 Rosalinda (1945)
 A Day with the Devil (1945)
 I Am a Fugitive (1946)
 The Associate (1946)
 Symphony of Life (1946)
 Gangster's Kingdom (1948)
 The Magician (1949)
 Over the Waves (1950)
 My General's Women (1951)
 The Three Elenas (1954)
 Love in the Shadows (1960)

References

Bibliography
 Rogelio Agrasánchez. Guillermo Calles: A Biography of the Actor and Mexican Cinema Pioneer. McFarland, 2010.

External links

Year of birth unknown
Year of death unknown
Mexican male film actors